Indrapuri is a neighbourhood in Patna, in the Indian state Bihar.  This area is under the jurisdiction of Pataliputra police station of Patna Police.

References 

Neighbourhoods in Patna